Ulleung County (Korean: 울릉군, Ulleung-gun; Hanja: 鬱陵郡) is a county in North Gyeongsang Province, South Korea.

Ulleung County has a population of 10,426 making it the least populated county in South Korea. Ulleung County consists mainly of the island of Ulleungdo and 44 smaller islands located in the Sea of Japan, including the Liancourt Rocks (Dokdo) in effective governance by South Korea (but claimed by Japan and North Korea). Ulleung County is administratively divided into one eup and two myeon: Ulleung-eup, Buk-myeon, and Seo-myeon, which are divided into 10 legal ri, those into 25 administrative ri, and at the most basic level the county is held to contain 56 "natural villages."

History
At the year of 512, Jijeung of Silla conquered Usan-guk which was the original nation in Ulleung-do. After a downfall of Silla, Goryeo naturally took the title of Ulleung. In 930, 13th year of Taejo of Goryeo, he granted local people bringing a tribute.

Hyeonjong of Goryeo sent his ambassador to islands for recovering ruined farming land in 1012.

Location
It is located in the middle of the Sea of Japan between the Korean Peninsula and Japan. There are two main ports that provide ferries to Ulleung and Liancourt Rocks (Dokdo): Pohang Port and Mukho Port. These two ports offer regular shipping service.

Administrative divisions

Ulleung-gun is divided into one eup and two myeon. Ulleung-eup is then divided into four legal ri, but six administrative ri. Buk-myeon is divided into three legal ri, eight administrative ri. Seo-myeon is divided into three legal ri, five administrative ri.

Snowflower Festival
Ulleung County, which has one of the highest snowfalls in all of Korea, hosts the Snowflower Festival. In 2007, Ulleung had lot of snow, up to 42 cm (16.5 in) around coastlines and 105 cm (around 3 ft 5in) in the Nari Basin. But the county did not host its festival before 2006 as there was not enough snow.

Symbols
 Tree: Machilus thunbergii
 Flower: camelliar flower
 Bird: wood pigeon

Climate
Ulleung has a cooler version of a humid subtropical climate (Köppen: Cfa) with very warm, rainy summers and cold, snowy winters.

Tourism

Tourist spots 
Places recommended by Gyeongsangbuk-do Culture & Tourism Organization

Twin towns and sister cities

Ulleung is twinned with:

  Anyang, South Korea
  Pohang, South Korea
  Suyeong-gu, South Korea
  Samcheok, South Korea

References

External links
 Official county government website

 
Counties of North Gyeongsang Province
Sea of Japan
Port cities and towns in South Korea